Hiripoda Wassa is a 2005 Sinhalese romantic movie directed by Udayakantha Warnasuriya and produced by Soma Edirisinghe for EAP Films. It stars Roshan Ranawana and Pubudu Chathuranga in lead roles along with Chathurika Peiris and Jayalath Manoratne. Music composed by Bathiya and Santhush. They story revolves around young lives engulfed in the challenges in the present-day society, in Sri Lanka. It is the 1063rd Sri Lankan film in the Sinhalese cinema. The film brought Harshini Perera, Jayantha Atapattu and Akila Sandakelum to cinema for the first time.

Plot
The story revolves round three teenagers - Prageeth (Roshan), a younger, darker version of Hugh Grant, the son of a business tycoon (Corea), whose fiancé is Veena (Anarkali); Sithum (Pubudu), the son of a Postman (Jayalath) is in love with Pooja, (Chathurika) while Ramith who says he comes from the middle class, and is seduced by his biology teacher who as luck would have it lives in an apartment directly opposite his block of flats, nevertheless, voices every teenagers views of life when he says all he wants to do is to take things easy." (Shape eke jeevath venava).

Cast
 Roshan Ranawana as Prageeth Justin Molligoda
 Pubudu Chathuranga as Sithum Panthaka Waduge
 Jayantha Atapattu as Ramith Kariyapperuma
 Chathurika Peiris as Pooja
 Jayalath Manoratne as Sithum's father
 Akila Sandakelum as Gihan
 Anarkali Akarsha as Veena
 Janith Wickramage as Chamara
 Harshini Perera as Teacher
 Nilmini Kottegoda as Sithum's mother
 Mihira Sirithilaka as Sarath
 Seetha Kumari as Prema 
 Ranjan Ramanayake - himself, special appearance.
 Jeevarani Kurukulasuriya as Pooja's mother
 Vijaya Corea as Prageeth's father

Reviews
Hiripoda Wassa however, is not a movie that would make you think or cry, and no one would dream of using the highest compliment on the tongues of the teenage characters in the movie to describe it."

Soundtrack

References

External links
Sri Lanka Cinema Database

2006 films
2006 romantic drama films
Films set in Sri Lanka (1948–present)
Sri Lankan romantic drama films
2000s Sinhala-language films
Films directed by Udayakantha Warnasuriya